Boutwell Creek is a stream in Clearwater County, Minnesota, in the United States.

Boutwell Creek was named for William Thurston Boutwell, a minister who accompanied explorer Henry Schoolcraft on one of his expeditions.

See also
List of rivers of Minnesota

References

Rivers of Clearwater County, Minnesota
Rivers of Minnesota